IAPC may stand for:

International Association of Press Clubs
Institute for the Advancement of Philosophy for Children, a Philosophy for Children organisation
International Auditing Practices Committee, now the International Auditing and Assurance Standards Board